The cast of the television series MythBusters perform experiments to verify or debunk urban legends, old wives' tales, and the like. This is a list of the various myths tested on the show as well as the results of the experiments (the myth is either Busted, Plausible, or Confirmed).

Episode overview

Episode P1 – "Jet-Assisted Chevy"
 Original air date: January 23, 2003

JATO Car
This myth was inspired by the Darwin Award-winning Arizona Dept. of Public Safety story about a former Air Force sergeant mounting a JATO rocket to a 1967 Chevrolet Impala and firing the rocket while at highway speed——on a deserted road.

Pop Rocks
This myth was inspired by the alleged death of Little Mikey of Life Cereals commercial fame—allegedly due to gastric rupture caused by an excess of carbon dioxide from a six-pack of soda and six pouches of Pop Rocks.

Episode P2 – "Biscuit Bazooka"
 Original air date: January 23, 2003

Stuck on You
This myth was inspired by a BBC and Reuters story about an obese woman flying on a Scandinavian Airlines System flight from Europe and getting stuck on the lavatory toilet due to suction, forcing the crew to land the plane while she was still on the toilet.

Biscuit Bullet

Falling Lawyer

Episode P3 – "Poppy-Seed Drug Test"
 Original air date: March 7, 2003

Lawn Chair Balloon

Poppy Seed Drug Test

Goldfinger

References

External links

 
 

pilot
2003 American television seasons
Television pilot seasons